Ilka Agricola (born 8 August 1973 in The Hague) is a German mathematician who deals with differential geometry and its applications in mathematical physics. She is dean of mathematics and computer science at the University of Marburg, where she has also been responsible for making public the university's collection of mathematical models.

Life and work
Agricola studied physics at the Technical University of Munich and the University of Munich from 1991 to 1996. After a guest stay at Rutgers University in New Jersey (United States) that lasted until the end of 1997 she went to the Humboldt-Universität zu Berlin, where in 2000 she earned a mathematics doctorate under .

From 2003 to 2008, she led one of the Volkswagen Foundation funded research groups at Humboldt University in the field of special geometries in mathematical physics. From 2004 to 2008 she was a project manager in the priority program for string theory at the German Research Foundation and the Collaborative Research Center 1080. Agricola took the Habilitation in 2004 at the University of Greifswald in mathematics. In 2008 she was appointed full professor at the University of Marburg.  From November 2014 until October 2018, she has been Dean of the Department of Mathematics and Computer Science. She is president of the German Mathematical Society for 2021–2022.

Agricola is Editor in Chief of two academic journals in mathematics published by Springer Science+Business Media, Annals of Global Analysis and Geometry (since 2015) and Mathematische Semesterberichte (since 2021). She is
an editor of the journal Communications in Mathematics published by De Gruyter.

Awards and honors
In 2003, Ilka Agricola received the Medal of Honor of Charles University in Prague. She was named a Fellow of the American Mathematical Society, in the 2022 class of fellows, "for contributions to differential geometry, in particular manifolds with special holonomy and on non-integrable geometric structures and for service to the mathematical community".

Selected publications

Books
 . Translated from the 2001 German original by Andreas Nestke.
 . Translated from the 2005 German original by Philip G. Spain.

Papers
 .
 .
 .
 .

References

External links

 Ilka Agricola homepage at the University of Marburg
 Author profile of Ilka Agricola in the database zbMATH
 Papers by Ilka Agricola listed on ResearchGate

1973 births
21st-century Dutch mathematicians
21st-century German mathematicians
Dutch women mathematicians
German women mathematicians
Living people
21st-century women mathematicians
21st-century German women
Fellows of the American Mathematical Society
Presidents of the German Mathematical Society